The 1991 German Open was a tennis tournament played on outdoor clay courts and was part of the ATP Super 9 of the 1991 ATP Tour. It took place at the Rothenbaum Tennis Center in Hamburg, Germany, from May 6 through May 13, 1991. Sergio Casal and Emilio Sánchez won in the final against Cássio Motta and Danie Visser, 7–6, 7–6.

Seeds

  Sergio Casal /  Emilio Sánchez (champions)
  Udo Riglewski /  Michael Stich (Quarterfinal)
  Patrick Galbraith /  Todd Witsken (Quarterfinal)
  Broderick Dyke /  Laurie Warder (second round)
  Sergi Bruguera /  Jim Courier (semifinal)
  Mark Koevermans /  Michiel Schapers (first round)
  Omar Camporese /  Mark Woodforde (first round)
  Cássio Motta /  Danie Visser (final)

Draw

Finals

Top half

Bottom half

References

Doubles